Prince of Xing, was a first-rank princely peerage used during Ming dynasty, the principality was created by Chenghua Emperor for his fourth son, Zhu Youyuan. As Zhu Youyuan only survived son, Zhu Houcong was enthroned as Jiajing Emperor, the principality was absorbed into the crown.

Generation name / poem
As members of this peerage were descendants of Yongle Emperor, their generation poem was:-

Members

Zhu Youyuan (1st), fourth son of Chenghua Emperor. He was made the Prince of Xing by his father on 30 July 1487 and he held the principality until 13 July 1519. He took his princedom which located at Anlu state in 1494. Before he was posthumously honored as an emperor, his original posthumous name was:  (興獻王)
Unnamed (7 - 12 Jul 1500), first son of Zhu Youyuan, he died five days after he was born. Jiajing Emperor posthumously bestowed him with the title "Prince Huai of Yue" (岳懷王) in 1525. He was renamed "Zhu Houxi" (朱厚熙) on May 1560 by Jiajing Emperor.
2nd son: Zhu Houcong (2nd), he was designated the hereditary prince . He managed his fief as Hereditary Prince of Xing as he was mourning for three years for his father's death. The imperial court approved him to succeed his father's principality for succeeded the throne from Zhengde Emperor. Before he enthroned, he had held the title of Prince of Xing for a month (15 Apr - 27 May 1521).

Female members
Zhu Youyuan, Prince Xian of Xing
1st daughter: Name unknown (26 Nov 1501 - 16 Apr 1504), she was full-sister of Jiajing Emperor. She was posthumously bestowed as a princess by Jiajing Emperor under the title "Princess Changning" (長寧公主).
2nd daughter: Name unknown (21 Jul 1503 - 15 May 1512), she was half-sister of Jiajing Emperor. She was posthumously bestowed as a princess by Jiajing Emperor with the title "Princess Shanhua" (善化公主).
3rd daughter: Name unknown (died 1525), originally held the title of a commandery princess under the title Comm. Princess Changshou (長壽郡主). She was promoted to a first-rank princess (imperial sister) in 1523 by Jiajing Emperor under the title Princess Yongfu (永福公主). She married an Embroidered Uniform Guard name Wu Jinghe (鄔景和; 1508 - 1568). The History of Ming wrongly recorded her as a daughter of Hongzhi Emperor.
4th daughter: Name unknown (1510 - 1540), she was full-sister of Jiajing Emperor. She was promoted to a princess by Jiajing Emperor in 1527 under the title Princess Yongchun (永淳公主).

References

Ming dynasty princely peerages
Imperial families of Ming dynasty